John F. Swantek (15 May 1933 – 7 January 2022) was a Polish Catholic prelate who was the prime bishop of the Polish National Catholic Church from 1986 until his resignation in 2002. He died on January 7, 2022, at the age of 88.

References 

1930s births
2022 deaths
Year of birth missing
American bishops
American people of Polish descent
Bishops of the Polish National Catholic Church
Prime Bishops of the Polish National Catholic Church
People from Cheshire, Connecticut